Harvest Records is a British-American record label belonging to Capitol Music Group, originally created by EMI in 1969.

History
Harvest Records was created by EMI in 1969 to market progressive rock music, and to compete with Philips' Vertigo and Decca's Deram labels, and the independent Island label. Harvest was initially under the direction of Malcolm Jones, and was distributed in North America by EMI's US affiliate, Capitol Records. They were the European licensee for the American label Blue Thumb Records from 1969 to 1971.

In the 1970s, the label primarily released progressive rock recordings by British acts including Pink Floyd, Syd Barrett, Kevin Ayers, The Move, Roy Wood, Barclay James Harvest, Be Bop Deluxe and Deep Purple. Most acts on the Harvest roster were British; two notable exceptions were Australian progressive band Spectrum (whose first two LPs were issued on Harvest) and Spectrum's successor Ariel, whose first two LPs also came out on the label. The Danish musician Sebastian had three albums released in Denmark on the Harvest label between 1972 and 1974.

The focus of the label changed slightly as the 1970s drew to a close, with the signing of post-punk groups Wire, Australian band the Saints and the Banned. New wave artists Thomas Dolby released his debut album and fellow new wave act Duran Duran released its first two albums on the label in North America. Australian soft rock band Little River Band and English heavy metal band Iron Maiden's first three albums were also released in the US by the label. Pink Floyd switched to Columbia Records in the US after the release of The Dark Side of the Moon in 1973.

In the United States, Capitol initially treated Harvest as a separate label that they expected big sales from. After only a few issues, they had few sales to show for their effort and consequently only issued a few releases and numbered them within their standard Capitol LP series (mostly using Harvest for Pink Floyd releases). After this initial short-lived series, Capitol passed on most of the UK Harvest artists.

In 1975, a reissue sub-label was launched called Harvest Heritage. This new label largely compiled material that had been previously released on Harvest from 1969 onward. However, Harvest Heritage also reissued music from late 1960s EMI bands that had never recorded for the label, such as the Gods, Love Sculpture and Tomorrow. Heritage also occasionally released new music, such as Four Rock 'n' Roll Legends, a recording of a 1977 concert by rockabilly veterans Charlie Feathers, Buddy Knox, Jack Scott and Warren Smith.

Most of Harvest's European back catalog (including Pink Floyd [see exception below], Deep Purple [pre-1971], Duran Duran, and Iron Maiden) were divested by Universal Music after its takeover of EMI, as part of the Parlophone Label Group. Warner Music Group would buy that part of the catalog in February 2013. Rights to the Australian Harvest recordings, including those from the Saints and Little River Band, were ceded to Universal's EMI Recorded Music Australia imprint.

Pink Floyd Records controls the Pink Floyd catalog which licensed the catalog for manufacture and distribution by Warner Music Group for the UK and European markets and by Sony Music Entertainment for North America and the rest of the world.

Capitol Music Group announced its relaunch of the label on 25 February 2013, with former Warner Bros. Records and Dangerbird Records executive Piero Giramonti at the helm. Giramonti is tasked with running the label as an independent label, with the support of Capitol Music Group and Caroline Distribution for distribution, radio promotion and licensing. As of 2013, the Harvest roster consists of TV on the Radio, Arthur Beatrice, Babes, Death Grips, the Olms, Together Pangea, White Lies and Young & Sick.

On 15 January 2014, it was announced that Morrissey and Charlotte OC had signed to Harvest Records.

Discography

1969
 Deep Purple – The Book of Taliesyn
 Pete Brown and His Battered Ornaments – A Meal You Can Shake Hands with in the Dark
 Panama Limited Jug Band – Panama Limited Jug Band
 Shirley and Dolly Collins – Anthems in Eden
 Michael Chapman – Rainmaker
 Third Ear Band – Alchemy
 Edgar Broughton Band – Wasa Wasa
 The Battered Ornaments – Mantle-Piece
 Deep Purple – Deep Purple
 Forest – Forest
 Tea & Symphony – An Asylum for the Musically Insane
 Bakerloo – Bakerloo
 Kevin Ayers – Joy of a Toy
 Pink Floyd – Ummagumma

1970
 Various Artists – Picnic – A Breath of Fresh Air (Sampler)
 Michael Chapman – Fully Qualified Survivor
 Syd Barrett – The Madcap Laughs
 Roy Harper – Flat Baroque and Berserk
 Ron Geesin & Roger Waters - Music from The Body
 Deep Purple – Concerto for Group and Orchestra
 Pete Brown & Piblokto! – Things May Come and Things May Go but the Art School Dance Goes on Forever
 Greatest Show on Earth – Horizons
 Barclay James Harvest – Barclay James Harvest
 Shirley and Dolly Collins – Love, Death and the Lady
 Edgar Broughton Band – Sing Brother Sing
 Third Ear Band – Third Ear Band
 Pretty Things – Parachute
 Quatermass – Quatermass
 Kevin Ayers and the Whole World – Shooting at the Moon
 Deep Purple – Deep Purple in Rock
 Panama Limited – Indian Summer
 Pink Floyd – Atom Heart Mother
 Syd Barrett – Barrett
 Pete Brown & Piblokto! – Thousands on a Raft
 The Greatest Show on Earth – The Going's Easy
 Love – Out Here
 Forest – Full Circle
 Tea & Symphony – Jo Sago A Play on Music
 Michael Chapman – Window
 Dave Mason – Alone Together
 Chris Spedding- Backwood Progression

1971
 Various Artists - The Harvest Bag (Special Budget Sampler)
 Love – False Start
 Barclay James Harvest – Once Again
 Roy Harper – Stormcock
 The Grease Band – The Grease Band
 Edgar Broughton Band – Edgar Broughton Band
 East of Eden – East of Eden
 The Move - Message from the Country
 Deep Purple – Fireball
 Barclay James Harvest – Barclay James Harvest & Other Short Stories
 Pink Floyd – Meddle
 East of Eden – New Leaf
 Electric Light Orchestra – The Electric Light Orchestra
 Michael Chapman – Wrecked Again
 Southern Comfort – Southern Comfort

1972
 Babe Ruth - First Base
 Janus - Gravedigger
 Kevin Ayers – Whatevershebringswesing
 Pink Floyd – Obscured by Clouds
 Sebastian – Den store flugt
 Spontaneous Combustion – Spontaneous Combustion
 Edgar Broughton Band – Inside Out
 Spontaneous Combustion – Triad
 Barclay James Harvest – Baby James Harvest

1973
 Kayak – See See the Sun
 Roy Wood – Boulders
 Pink Floyd – The Dark Side of the Moon
 Electric Light Orchestra – ELO 2
 Kevin Ayers – Bananamour
 Roy Harper – Lifemask
 Mark-Almond – Rising
 Edgar Broughton Band – Oora
 Pink Floyd – Atom Heart Mother (Quadrophonic release)
 Barclay James Harvest – Once Again (Quadrophonic release)
 Ariel – A Strange Fantastic Dream
 Sadistic Mika Band – Sadistic Mika Band
 Sebastian – Over havet under himlen
 Corben Simpson – Get Up With The Sun HSD 1030
 Wizzard – Wizzard Brew

1974
 Babe Ruth – Amar Caballero
 Be-Bop Deluxe – Axe Victim
 Syd Barrett – Syd Barrett (Double reissue of The Madcap Laughs and Barrett)
 Pink Floyd – A Nice Pair (Double reissue of The Piper at the Gates of Dawn and A Saucerful of Secrets)
 Roy Harper – Flashes from the Archives of Oblivion
 Sadistic Mika Band – Black Ship
 Sebastian – Blød lykke 
 Triumvirat – Illusions on a Double Dimple
 Kayak  – Kayak II
 Wizzard – See My Baby Jive (compilation)
 The Move – California Man (compilation)
 Electric Light Orchestra – Showdown (compilation)
 The Frenchies -  Lola Cola 

1975
 Pink Floyd – Wish You Were Here (Europe only)
 Roy Harper – HQ 
 Be-Bop Deluxe – Futurama
 Ariel – Rock 'n' Roll Scars
 Edgar Broughton Band – A Bunch of 45s (Harvest Heritage compilation)
 Quatermass – Quatermass (Harvest Heritage reissue)
 Climax Blues Band – 1969 – 1972 (Harvest Heritage compilation)
 Greatest Show on Earth – Greatest Show on Earth (Harvest Heritage compilation)
 The Pretty Things – S.F. Sorrow/Parachute (Harvest Heritage double reissue)
 Kevin Ayers – Joy of a Toy/Shooting at the Moon - (Harvest Heritage double reissue)
 Maneige – First Album and Les Porches

1976
 Kevin Ayers – Odd Ditties (compilation)
 Be-Bop Deluxe – Sunburst Finish
 Third Ear Band – Experiences
 Shirley Collins – Amaranth
 Southern Comfort – Distilled
 Tomorrow – Tomorrow (reissue)
 Little River Band – Little River Band (US and Canada)
 The Gods – The Gods
 Be-Bop Deluxe – Modern Music
 Ashley Hutchings – Son of Morris On
 Roy Wood – The Roy Wood Story (Double reissue)

1977
 The Albion Dance Band – The Prospect Before Us
 Pink Floyd – Animals (Europe only)
 Be-Bop Deluxe – Live! In the Air Age
 Barclay James Harvest – The Best of Barclay James Harvest
 Electric Light Orchestra – The Light Shines On
 Deep Purple – Shades of Deep Purple (Reissue)
 Little River Band – Diamantina Cocktail (US and Canada only)
 Pete Brown & Piblokto!/Battered Ornaments – My Last Band
 John Lees – A Major Fancy
 Babe Ruth – The Best of Babe Ruth
 Various Artists – Harvest Heritage 20 Greats (Sampler album)
 Roy Wood – Boulders (Reissue)
 The Pretty Things – Singles A's & B's
 Soft Machine – Triple Echo
 Wire – Pink Flag

1978
 The Albion Band – Rise Up Like the Sun
 Be-Bop Deluxe – Drastic Plastic
 David Gilmour – David Gilmour (Europe only)
 Rick Wright – Wet Dream (Europe only)
 Jack Scott/Charlie Feathers/Buddy Knox/Warren Smith – Four Rock 'n' Roll Legends Recorded in London
 Roy Harper – 1970 – 1975
 Little River Band – Sleeper Catcher (US and Canada only)
 Deep Purple – The Deep Purple Singles A's and B's
 Be-Bop Deluxe – The Best of and the Rest of Be-Bop Deluxe
 Can – Out of Reach
 Barclay James Harvest – The Best of Barclay James Harvest Volume 2
 Wire – Chairs Missing
 Kate Bush - The Kick Inside (US and Canada only)
 Soft Machine -  Alive & Well: Recorded in Paris

1979
 Morrissey–Mullen – Cape Wrath
 Electric Light Orchestra – The Light Shines On Vol 2
 Various Artists – The Rare Stuff
  
 The Move – Shines On
 Eberhard Schoener – Video Flashback
 Pink Floyd – The Wall (Europe only)
 Kate Bush - Lionheart (Canada only)
 Scorpions – Lovedrive SHSP 4097
 Wire – 154
 The Monks - Bad Habits (Canada only)

1980
 Iron Maiden – Iron Maiden (US and Canada only)
 Roy Harper – The Unknown Soldier
 Dave Edmunds & Love Sculpture – Singles A's & B's
 Deep Purple – Deep Purple in Concert
 Scorpions – Animal Magnetism SHSP 4113
 Kate Bush - Never for Ever (Canada only)

1981
 Be-Bop Deluxe – Singles A's & B's
 Bowers-Ducharme  – Bowers-Ducharme (Canada only)
 Nick Mason's Fictitious Sports (Europe only)
 Iron Maiden – Killers (US and Canada only)
 Duran Duran – Duran Duran (US and Canada only)
 Pink Floyd – A Collection of Great Dance Songs (Europe only)
 Barclay James Harvest – The Best of Barclay James Harvest Volume 3

1982
 Scorpions – Blackout (the world outside the US and Canada)
 Duran Duran – Rio (US and Canada only)
 Iron Maiden – The Number of the Beast (US and Canada only)
 Thomas Dolby - Blinded by Science
 Thomas Dolby - The Golden Age of Wireless
 Jon Lord - Before I Forget

1983
 Pink Floyd – The Final Cut (Europe only)

1984
 David Gilmour – About Face (re-released by EMI in 2006 and again by Parlophone in 2014) (Europe only)
 Scorpions - Love at First Sting (the world outside the US and Canada)
 Pallas – The Sentinel (outside North America)
 Roger Waters – The Pros and Cons of Hitch Hiking
 Zee – Identity

1985
 Scorpions - World Wide Live (the world outside the US and Canada)
 Nick Mason and Rick Fenn – Profiles (Europe only)

1986
 Pallas – The Wedge

1988
 Scorpions - Savage Amusement (the world outside the US and Canada)
 Syd Barrett – Opel

1989
 Jeff Lynne – A Message from the Country 1968-1973
 Kevin Ayers – Banana Productions: The Best Of

1990s
 1990 – Be-Bop Deluxe – Raiding the Divine Archive 
 1991 – The Beyond –  Crawl
 1992 – Scorpions – Still Loving You (the world outside North America)
 1994 – Motorpsycho – Timothy's Monster''' (3-album box set)
 1999 – Various Artists – Harvest Festival (5-CD book)
 1999 – Dark Star – Twenty Twenty Sound2000s
 2001 – Syd Barrett – Wouldn't You Miss Me 2005 – Patrick Duff – Luxury Problems 2005 – Amorphous Androgynous – Alice in Ultraland 2005 – The Move – Message from the Country 2005 – Various Artists – Harvest Showdown Electric Light Orchestra/The Move/Roy Wood/Wizzard
 2006 – Various Artists – It Wasn't My Idea to Dance - A Harvest Sampler 2006 – Pete Brown – Living Life Backwards – The Best of Pete Brown 2007 – Various Artists – A Breath of Fresh Air – A Harvest Records Anthology / 1969 – 1974 2008 – Kevin Ayers – Songs for Insane Times: Anthology 1969 – 19802011
 Be-Bop Deluxe – Futurist Manifesto (2011) 5-CD set, fifth disc comprises previously unreleased material

2012
   Remastered and expanded
 Death Grips - No Love Deep Web2013
 The Olms - "The Olms"
 White Lies - Big TV D. A. Wallach - "Glowing" (Music video directed by Wolf Haley)
 Beady Eye - BE (North America)
 Death Grips - Government Plates2014
 Kasabian - 48:13 Morrissey - World Peace Is None Of Your Business 
 Syd Arthur - Sound Mirror (US & UK Release)
 Babes - "Die" (single)
 Babes - Untitled EP
 Banks - Goddess 
 TV On The Radio - Seeds 
2015
 Death Grips - The Powers That B Best Coast - California Nights Wynter Gordon - Five Needle (EP)
 The Libertines - Anthems for Doomed Youth (US release)
 The Greeting Committee - It's Not All That Bad2016
 Death Grips - Bottomless Pit Banks - The Altar2017
 Day Wave - The Days We Had2018
 Death Grips - Year of the Snitch2019
 Banks - III2021
 Lauren Auder - 5 Songs For The Dysphoric (EP)

2022
 Grace Ives - Janky Star''

References and notes

External links
 Harvest Label 1969 - 1980  Harvest Records collectors guide 
 HarvestRecords.com  Harvest Records Official Website

1969 establishments in the United Kingdom
Record labels established in 1969
EMI
British record labels
Progressive rock record labels
Record labels based in California
Re-established companies
Labels distributed by Universal Music Group
Labels distributed by Warner Music Group